James Ernest Paschall (born March 31, 1923) is a retired United States Air Force major general who served as vice commander of the Aerospace Defense Command.

References

1923 births
Living people
United States Air Force generals